Rezen Saddle is a geographical feature on Livingston Island in the South Shetland Islands, Antarctica.  The 600 m long horseshoe-shaped flat saddle of elevation 420 m lies between Rezen Knoll and Burdick Ridge in eastern Livingston Island, affording overland access from Balkan Snowfield to upper Perunika Glacier and Bowles Ridge area.

First visited by the Bulgarians Kuzman Tuhchiev, Dimo Dimov and Ivan Tashukov from St. Kliment Ohridski Base during the 1994/95 season.

The feature takes its name from the adjacent Rezen Knoll.

Location

Maps
 Isla Livingston: Península Hurd. Mapa topográfico de escala 1:25000. Madrid: Servicio Geográfico del Ejército, 1991. (Map reproduced on p. 16 of the linked work)
 L.L. Ivanov. Livingston Island: Central-Eastern Region. Scale 1:25000 topographic map.  Sofia: Antarctic Place-names Commission of Bulgaria, 1996.
 L.L. Ivanov et al. Antarctica: Livingston Island and Greenwich Island, South Shetland Islands. Scale 1:100000 topographic map. Sofia: Antarctic Place-names Commission of Bulgaria, 2005.
 L.L. Ivanov. Antarctica: Livingston Island and Greenwich, Robert, Snow and Smith Islands. Scale 1:120000 topographic map.  Troyan: Manfred Wörner Foundation, 2009.  
 Antarctic Digital Database (ADD). Scale 1:250000 topographic map of Antarctica. Scientific Committee on Antarctic Research (SCAR). Since 1993, regularly upgraded and updated.
 L.L. Ivanov. Antarctica: Livingston Island and Smith Island. Scale 1:100000 topographic map. Manfred Wörner Foundation, 2017.

References
 Rezen Saddle. SCAR Composite Antarctic Gazetteer
 Bulgarian Antarctic Gazetteer. Antarctic Place-names Commission. (details in Bulgarian, basic data in English)

External links
 Rezen Saddle. Copernix satellite image

Mountain passes of Livingston Island